Symmerus annulatus is a species of fly in the family Ditomyiidae. It is found in the  Palearctic .

References

Ditomyiidae
Insects described in 1830
Nematoceran flies of Europe